Cephaloflexa is a genus of land planarians from Brazil.

Description 
The genus Cephaloflexa is characterized by the presence of a cephalic retractor muscle not associated with cephalic glands. Due to this muscle, the head in species of  Cephaloflexa is rolled upwards or backwards similarly to Choeradoplana. The main external feature to distinguish Cephaloflexa from Choeradoplana is the presence of two “cushions” on the ventral side of the head of the latter.
The copulatory apparatus of Cephaloflexa lacks a permanent penis papilla.

Etymology 
The name Cephaloflexa comes from the Greek word κεφαλή (head) and the Latin word flexus (bending).

Species 
There are three described species in the genus Cephaloflexa:
Cephaloflexa araucariana Carbayo & Leal-Zanchet, 2003 
Cephaloflexa bergi (Graff, 1899)
Cephaloflexa nataliae (Froehlich, 1959)

References 

Geoplanidae
Rhabditophora genera